Cass Lake may refer to:

Lakes
Cass Lake (Vancouver Island), Canada
Cass Lake (Michigan), United States
Cass Lake (Minnesota), United States

Communities
Cass Lake, Minnesota, United States